The 2014 San Diego State Aztecs football team represented San Diego State University in the 2014 NCAA Division I FBS football season. The Aztecs were led by fourth-year head coach Rocky Long and played their home games at Qualcomm Stadium. They were members of the West Division of the Mountain West Conference.  San Diego State finished the season 7–6, 5–3 in Mountain West play to finish in a share for first place in the West Division. However, due to Mountain West tiebreaker rules, because of their head-to-head loss to Fresno State they were not considered division co–champions. They were invited to the  Poinsettia Bowl where they lost to Navy 16–17.

Schedule

References

San Diego State
San Diego State Aztecs football seasons
San Diego State Aztecs football